Sir Thomas Sebright, 4th Baronet (1692–1736) of Beechwood Park was an English landowner and politician who sat in the House of Commons from 1715 to 1736. Sebright was born on 11 May 1692, the eldest son of Sir Edward Sebright, 3rd Baronet of Besford, Worcestershire and his wife Anne Saunders, daughter and coheiress of Thomas Saunders of Beechwood, Hertfordshire. He succeeded his father in the baronetcy on 15 December 1702. He matriculated at Jesus College, Oxford on 3 June  1705 

In November 1718, he married Henrietta Dashwood, daughter of Sir Samuel Dashwood, MP and Lord Mayor of London. Sebright had inherited from his mother the Beechwood estate in Hertfordshire. He was elected Member of Parliament for Hertfordshire at the 1715 general election. He was re-elected at the succeeding elections of  1722, 1727 and  1734. Sebright died on 12 April 1736. He was a notable book collector. He left two sons, of whom Thomas inherited the baronetcy.

References

1692 births
1736 deaths
British MPs 1715–1722
British MPs 1722–1727
British MPs 1727–1734
British MPs 1734–1741
Members of the Parliament of Great Britain for Hertfordshire
Baronets in the Baronetage of England